Lucita Soriano (born Lucita Soriano Adriano; February 23, 1941 – July 8, 2015) was a Filipino actress, who appeared in more than 215 movies and television shows. She was runner-up in the Miss Philippine Press Photography (PPP) 1964 beauty pageant.

Career
Her first film contract was with Premiere Productions. She had a movie for a bit player role as one of the many women of Romeo Vasquez in Lover Boy (1958). Soriano's big break in the movies came when she auditioned for the movie I Believe (1961). In 1965, she did Pasko ng Limang Magdalena with Divina Valencia, Daisy Romualdez, Ruby Regala and Miriam Jurado. In 1967, she did Ako... Laban sa Lipunan. Her knowledge of karate won her a role in The Lady With An Iron Fist. She was FAMAS Award nominee for Best Supporting Actress in Dugo Ang Kulay ng Pag-ibig (1966). In And God Smiled at Me (1972), she won the Quezon City Film Festival Best Supporting Actress Award. She appeared in Valiente and Pangako Sa 'Yo.

Personal life
Soriano was born in Taguig to Eugenio and Elvira (Jamon Soriano) Adriano, and spent her early years in Pateros. Lucita Soriano attended elementary school in Taguig and completed her high school at Rizal High School. She studied at the University of the East and tried to earn a bachelor's degree, but her busy shooting schedule prevented her from finishing college.

When Soriano was paired with Rodolfo "Boy" Garcia in a film, they fell in love. They married in 1968. They had two sons, former members of That's Entertainment, actors Garry Clint Garcia and Marco Polo Garcia. Marco Polo, an actor and a regular on That's Entertainment, predeceased his mother, dying from cirrhosis of the liver in 2010. She was widowed on July 17, 1997. In 2009, she married Michael Mayr, a retired American civil engineer, whom she met during Bible study sessions.

Death
Soriano died at the Pacific Global Medical Center, Quezon City, Philippines on July 8, 2015, where she was earlier admitted to the intensive care unit.
She was interred at the Garden of Memories Memorial Park in Pateros

Filmography

Television

Valiente (TV series) (1992–1997)
Familia Zaragoza (TV series) (1995)
Mga Anino Sa Balon (TV movie) (1997)
Maalaala Mo Kaya – Sugat (1998)
Pangako sa 'Yo (TV series) (2000–2002)
Maalaala Mo Kaya – Cap (2009)

Movies

Alembong (1958)
Little Lucy (1961)
Mga Manugang ni Drakula (1963)
Dolpong Scarface: Agent 1-2-3 (December 15, 1964)
Dr. Yes (1965)
Pepe En Pilar (1966)
Solo Flight (February 19–28, 1967)
Masters of Karate (1968)
Mga Hagibis (1970)
Ito ang Tunay Na Lalaki (1973)
Mr. Wong and the Bionic Girls (1977)
Ex-Wife (1980)
Johnny Tanggo (1982)
Bayan Ko: Kapit sa Patalim (1984)
Tinik Sa Dibdib (1985)
Escort Girl (1985)
Kiri (1986)
Macho Dancer (1988)
Tupang Itim (1989)
Gumapang Ka sa Lusak (1990)
Padre Amante Guerrero (1993)
Bala at Lipistik (1994)
Nights of Serafina (1996)
Ang Babae sa Bintana (1998)
Alyas Lakay (1999)
Mahal Kita, Walang Iwanan (2000)
Buko Pandan (2002)
Lapu-Lapu (2002) - Mother of Katulanga
Woman of Breakwater (2003)

References

External links
Lucita marries American widower, philstar.com

Notice of death of Lucita Soriano, abs-cbnnews.com
"AND GOD SMILED AT ME VS. DAMA DE NOCHE", video48.blogspot.com

1941 births
2015 deaths
ABS-CBN personalities
Actresses from Metro Manila
Filipino Christians
Filipino women comedians
Filipino film actresses
Filipino people of Spanish descent
People from Pateros
People from Taguig
Filipino television actresses
Filipino beauty pageant winners